Tripko Džaković (1838 - 30 October 1875) was  Montenegrin Serb voivode who fought in many battles against Ottoman Turks.

In the year 1852, he participated in the fighting with Pljevlja Turks near Bistrica, where he was wounded twice. During the Montenegrin-Ottoman War from 1861 to 1862, he distinguished himself by his heroism and was a tribal Bayraktar. He was recognized by the Turks as the elder of the Tribes of Montenegro, particularly the tribes of Šaranci and Jezera after the demarcation in 1859. He was appointed tribal duke of great merit.

During the Herzegovina uprising in 1875, with a detachment of 500 armed men, he defended the crossing over  Tara near the village of Premčan, where he was killed in battle.

Literature 
  Military Encyclopedia, Belgrade, 1971, book two, pp. 599.
  Tomo P. Oraovac, "Voivode Tripko Džaković", Belgrade, 1935

See also
 Ilija Plamenac
 Gavro Vučković Krajišnik
 Marko Miljanov
 Joaksim Knežević
 Božo Petrović-Njegoš

References 

Montenegrin military personnel

1838 births
1875 deaths